Hasselvika is a village in the municipality of Indre Fosen in Trøndelag county, Norway. It is the location of the old Agdenes military fort as well as the Hasselvika Church.

References

Villages in Trøndelag
Indre Fosen